Keriman Halis Ece (February 16, 1913 – January 28, 2012) was a Turkish beauty pageant titleholder, pianist, and fashion model who won the Miss Turkey 1932 title.  She was also crowned Miss Universe 1932 in Spa, Belgium and thus became Turkey's first Miss Universe.

Biography
She was of Ubykh origin. Keriman Halis was born in Constantinople, Ottoman Empire, as one of the six children of a merchant from Hacıosman, Manyas, Tevfik Halis Bey, in 1913. She grew up in a family with a religious background. During her childhood, her family lived in Findikzade, where she was surrounded by French nannies.  Her grandfather was a Sheikh Al Islam, an advisor to the Ottoman Sultan Mehmed V. According to the Atlanta Constitution, her grandfather was a conservative mighty religious man who kept her secluded from the public in a palace in order to hide her beauty from the public. Only as after the establishment of Turkey, the environment for women became more liberal, she was allowed to interact with the public with the consent of her grandfather. He father was approached several times in order to allow her to compete in the beauty which he finally allowed in 1932. She participated 1932 in the Miss Turkey beauty pageant which since 1929 was organized by the newspaper Cumhuriyet. She was elected the most beautiful Turkish woman in the contest held on July 2, 1932 in İstanbul among eight candidates. Keriman Halis was sent then to the International Pageant of Pulchritude contest held in Spa, Belgium to represent Turkey. On July 31, 1932, she finished first among competitors from 27 countries, achieving Turkey's first title at an international beauty contest after three years only of its existence and less than a decade after the founding of the Republic. In 1933 she visited Egypt in a tour organized in cooperation with the Turkish Embassy in Egypt.

Personal life 
Her uncle was a renowned operetta composer, Muhlis Sabahattin Ezgi and her aunt a well-known musician and composer Neveser Kökdeş. Her brother is one of the former presidents of the Turkish sports club Galatasaray S.K., Turgan Ece.She was fluent in French and Turkish. Following the introduction of the surname act on June 21, 1934, Mustafa Kemal Atatürk gave her the family name "Ece", which means "queen" in Turkish. She died on January 28, 2012, nineteen days shy of her 99th birthday. She was laid to rest at the Feriköy Cemetery, Istanbul.

Reception 
As a Turkish beauty Queen, she was a symbol of the new liberty of women in Middle East, following the end of World War I and was celebrated in the Arab press in Egypt and the Syrian Mandate. Having come back to Turkey, President Mustafa Kemal (Atatürk) who was thrilled by the fact that an international jury found a Turkish girl as the Miss Universe, congratulated her for her manifestation of  “the noble beauty of the Turkish race“.

See also
 Azra Akın

References

 

1913 births
Turkish people of Abkhazian descent
Turkish people of Circassian descent
Turkish people of Ubykh descent
Miss Turkey winners
Models from Istanbul
2012 deaths
Burials at Feriköy Cemetery